Middelhagen is a village and a former municipality in the Vorpommern-Rügen district, in Mecklenburg-Vorpommern, Germany. Since January 2018, it is part of the new municipality Mönchgut.

References

External links

Official website of Middelhagen

Towns and villages on Rügen
Mönchgut
Former municipalities in Mecklenburg-Western Pomerania